The 1945 Ontario general election was held on June 4, 1945, to elect the 90 members of the 22nd Legislative Assembly of Ontario (Members of Provincial Parliament, or "MPPs") of the Province of Ontario.

The Ontario Progressive Conservative Party, led by George Drew, won a second consecutive term in office, winning a solid majority of seats in the legislature—66, up from 38 in the previous election.

The Ontario Liberal Party, led by former premier Mitchell Hepburn, was returned to the role of official opposition with 11 seats, plus 3 Liberal-Labour seats that it won, out of 6 contested, in coalition with the Labor-Progressive Party (which was, in fact, the Communist Party), in an effort to marginalize the CCF. The three new Liberal-Labour MPPs were James Newman of Rainy River, Joseph Meinzinger of Waterloo North and Alexander Parent of Essex North.

The social democratic Co-operative Commonwealth Federation (CCF), led by Ted Jolliffe, was reduced from 34 seats to only 8.

Two seats were won by the Labor-Progressive Party on its own with the re-election of A.A. MacLeod and J.B. Salsberg. The LPP contested a total of 31 ridings under the leadership of Leslie Morris who was defeated in the Toronto riding of Bracondale. As well, the Labor-Progressive Party ran several joint candidates with the Liberals under the Liberal-Labour banner.

The Drew government called the election in an attempt to get a majority government. By exploiting increasing Cold War tensions, the PC Party was able to defeat Jolliffe's CCF by stoking fears about communism. Jolliffe replied by giving a radio speech (written by Lister Sinclair) that accused Drew of running a political gestapo in Ontario, alleging that a secret department of the Ontario Provincial Police was acting as a political police spying on the opposition and the media. This accusation led to a backlash, and loss of support for the CCF, including the loss of Jolliffe's own seat of York South. This probably helped Drew win his majority, although in the 1970s, archival evidence was discovered proving the charge.

Results

|-
! colspan=2 rowspan=2 | Political party
! rowspan=2 | Party leader
! colspan=5 | MPPs
! colspan=3 | Votes
|-
! Candidates
!1943
!Dissol.
!1945
!±
!#
!%
! ± (pp)

|style="text-align:left;"|George Drew
|90
|38
|
|66
|28
|781,345
|44.25%
|8.75

|style="text-align:left;"|Mitchell Hepburn
|79
|15
|
|11
|4
|475,029
|26.90%
|3.32

|style="text-align:left;"|Ted Jolliffe
|89
|34
|
|8
|26
|395,708
|22.41%
|9.21

|style="text-align:left;"|
|7
|–
|–
|3
|3
|41,163
|2.33%
|

|style="text-align:left;"|Leslie Morris
|29
|2
|2
|2
|
|43,170
|2.44%
|1.54

|style="text-align:left;"|
|–
|–
|–
|–
|1
|colspan="3"|Did not campaign

|style="text-align:left;"|
|14
|–
|–
|–
|
|11,895
|0.67%
|0.47

|style="text-align:left;"|
|2
|–
|–
|–
|
|10,241
|0.58%
|0.27

|
|4
|–
|–
|–
|
|6,285
|0.36%
|0.18

|style="text-align:left;"|Socialist-Labour
|style="text-align:left;"|
|2
|–
|–
|–
|
|710
|0.04%
|0.01

|style="text-align:left;"|
|1
|–
|–
|–
|
|247
|0.01%
|

|style="text-align:left;"|
|–
|–
|–
|–
|
|colspan="3"|Did not campaign

|style="text-align:left;"|
|–
|–
|–
|–
|
|colspan="3"|Did not campaign

|colspan="3"|
|
|colspan="5"|
|-style="background:#E9E9E9;"
|colspan="3" style="text-align:left;"|Total
|317
|90
|90
|90
|
|1,765,793
|100.00%
|
|-
|colspan="8" style="text-align:left;"|Blank and invalid ballots
|align="right"|17,482
|style="background:#E9E9E9;" colspan="2"|
|-style="background:#E9E9E9;"
|colspan="8" style="text-align:left;"|Registered voters / turnout
|2,450,321
|72.78%
|14.04
|}

Seats that changed hands

There were 36 seats that changed allegiance in the election.

 PC to Liberal
Stormont

 Liberal to PC
Algoma—Manitoulin
Bruce
Grey North
Kent West
Lambton East
Muskoka—Ontario
Perth
Renfrew South

 CCF to PC
Bracondale
 Brantford
Hamilton Centre
Hamilton East
Hamilton—Wentworth
Lambton West
Niagara Falls
Ontario
Riverdale
St. David
Waterloo South
Welland
Wellington South
Windsor—Sandwich
Windsor—Walkerville
Woodbine
York East
York North
York South
York West

 CCF to Liberal
Cochrane North
Nipissing
Parry Sound

 CCF to Liberal-Labour
Essex North
Rainy River
Waterloo North

 Independent-Liberal to PC
Elgin

See also
Politics of Ontario
List of Ontario political parties
Premier of Ontario
Leader of the Opposition (Ontario)

References

1945 elections in Canada
1945
1945 in Ontario
June 1945 events in Canada